Talipariti elatum, the blue mahoe, is a species of flowering tree in the mallow family, Malvaceae.

Distribution
Talipariti elatum is native to the islands of Cuba, Jamaica the US. Virgin Islands and Puerto Rico. It is the national tree of Jamaica.

Description

The Talipariti elatum tree is quite attractive with its straight trunk, broad green leaves and hibiscus-like flowers. It grows quite rapidly, often attaining  or more in height. The attractive flower changes color as it matures, going from bright yellow to orange red and finally to crimson.

The name mahoe is derived from a Carib word. The ‘blue’ refers to blue-green streaks in the polished wood, giving it a distinctive appearance.

Uses
The blue mahoe is a beautiful and durable timber that is widely used for cabinet making and also for making decorative objects such as picture frames, bowls and wood carvings.

The inner bark of the tree is often referred to as Cuba bark because it was formerly used for tying bundles of Havana cigars.. Similarly the bark could be used to form a strap or belt.

The wood has a musical quality and has been traditionally used in the making of cuatros, a type of lute. Fine boxes, furniture, inlay works, floors, details, turned pieces, jewellery boxes, sculptures, and ancient board games, have been made from the mahoe. It is utilized by architects, furniture-makers, designers, artists, and amateur woodworkers. The wood has fine sanding and turning qualities, and a natural gloss that is accentuated when  finely finished; it is variegated in purple, metallic blue, and olive colors, often with bluish blue streaks.  In some lumber there can be grey, green, black, blue and purple colors all combined in just one small piece.  Growing conditions may be responsible for the color variations but this has not been proven.

Mahoe or Taliparti elatum, (also known as "blue mahoe" for the characteristic coloration of its wood after milling), is a tree native to Jamaica and Cuba. A volunteer species, characteristic of open disturbed habitats and also found, due to its shade tolerance, as an understory tree in secondary forests, mahoe grows to 25 m tall and upwards of 100 cm DBH (KIMBER, 1970).  It was recognized as a potentially important species for plantation and forest enrichment after a survey by Jamaican foresters (LONG, 1963 cited in KIMBER, 1970). It is an excellent wood with a rich variety of colors and attractive grain, but surprisingly, very little mahoe is currently being produced anywhere else. Mahoe can vary greatly in color from tree to tree, the blue tone does not tend to endure for many years. The wood transforms over time to shades of browns, purples, greys, and bluey-greens. The first plantings in Puerto Rico were in the 1940s and it has been also been introduced to other Caribbean islands and Hawaii for evaluation. It has become naturalized in Mexico, Peru, Brazil, southern Florida and the West Indies (CHUDNOFF, 1982 cited in WEAVER, FRANCIS, n.d.)

References

Hibisceae
Trees of Jamaica
Trees of Cuba
Trees of Puerto Rico
Flora of Puerto Rico
Taxa named by Olof Swartz
Flora without expected TNC conservation status